Widmeyer Wildlife Management Area, is located about  north of Great Cacapon, West Virginia in Morgan County.

The WMA is accessed from Bennett Lane off Cacapon Road (WV Route 9) between Great Cacapon and Berkeley Springs.

Hunting and fishing

Hunting opportunities in the WMA include deer, squirrel, and turkey.

Camping is not available at the WMA.

See also

Animal conservation
Hunting
List of West Virginia wildlife management areas

References

External links
West Virginia DNR District 2 Wildlife Management Areas
West Virginia Hunting Regulations
West Virginia Fishing Regulations

Wildlife management areas of West Virginia
Protected areas of Morgan County, West Virginia
IUCN Category V